Faryd Suleyman (born 3 January 1994) is a Ukrainian footballer currently playing as a striker in the FC Sumy.

Suleyman is a product of the FC Metalurh Donetsk, FC Monolit and FC Metalist youth sportive school systems.

After playing at amateur level, in July 2014 he signed a contract with FC Sumy in the Ukrainian First League.

References

External links

1994 births
Living people
Ukrainian footballers
Association football forwards
PFC Sumy players
Place of birth missing (living people)